The 1988–89 Ranji Trophy was the 55th season of the Ranji Trophy, the premier first-class cricket tournament that took place in India between October 1988 and March 1989. Delhi defeated Bengal by an innings and 210 runs in the final.

Sachin Tendulkar made his first-class debut in this season, in December 1988. Playing for Bombay at home in the Wankhede Stadium against Gujarat, he made a century in his debut innings, scoring 100 not out off 129 balls, becoming the youngest Indian to do to so.

Group stage

North Zone

Central Zone

East Zone

South Zone

West Zone

Knockout stage 

(F) - Advanced to next round on First Innings Lead.

Pre-quarter-finals

Quarter-finals

Semi-finals 
Delhi qualified for the final for the tenth time by virtue of a first innings lead after its match against Bombay ended in a draw. Requiring 152 runs to surpass Delhi's first innings score of 409, Bombay were dismissed for 321, that included a fighting 78 off 171 balls by Sachin Tendulkar.

Bengal made it to their ninth final, their first since the 1971–72 competition, also by virtue of a first innings lead, against Tamil Nadu. Earlier in Tamil Nadu's innings, Woorkeri Raman scored 238, recording his third double century in as many matches. In the process, he broke the 45-year-old record of Rusi Modi for most runs in a single season of the competition (1,008). Gautam Shome, who played his first game of the season for Bengal, removed Raman and P. C. Prakash before Tamil Nadu were dismissed 61 runs short of Bengal's first innings tally.

Final

References

External links
 Ranji Trophy, 1988-89 at ESPN Cricinfo
 

1989 in Indian cricket
Domestic cricket competitions in 1988–89
Ranji Trophy seasons